Sexy is an adjective to describe a sexually appealing person (or thing), primarily referring to physical attractiveness. It may also refer to:
 Sexual arousal, the arousal of sexual desire, during or in anticipation of sexual activity
 Sexual attraction, meaning anything which has the ability to attract the sexual or erotic interest of a person

Arts and media

Music
 Sexy (Klymaxx song), a song by Klymaxx
 "Sexy (Is the Word)", a song by Melissa Tkautz
 "Sexy", a song by Bad Gyal
 "Sexy", a song by The Black Eyed Peas, from the album Elephunk
 "Sexy", a song by Faraón Love Shady
 "Sexy", a song by French Affair
 "Sexy", a song by Australian Idol season 3 contestant Roxane LeBrasse
 "Sexy", a song by Les Jumo feat. Mohombi
 S.E.X.Y., an EP by TQ
 "S-E-X-X-Y", a song by They Might Be Giants
 Sexy Sadie, a song by The Beatles

Other media
 Sexy (novel), a 2005 novel by Joyce Carol Oates
 "Sexy" (Glee), a 2011 episode from the series' second season

Other uses
 Sexy, Peru, a populated place in Peru
 Sexy prime, a pair of prime numbers that differ by six

See also

Sex (disambiguation)